Brian Phipps is a professional lacrosse player for Whipsnakes Lacrosse Club of the Premier Lacrosse League, having previously played for Redwoods. He attended the University of Maryland where he was a USILA All-American, the ACC Freshman of the Year in 2007, and the University of Maryland Male Athlete of the Year as the Terrapins' goalkeeper. He was taken in the 9th round of the MLL Expansion Draft in 2011 by the Chesapeake Bayhawks. He also previously worked as an assistant coach for the Georgetown Hoyas men’s lacrosse team, and is currently the head coach at Archbishop Spalding High School.

References

1987 births
Living people
Sportspeople from Annapolis, Maryland
Maryland Terrapins men's lacrosse players
Georgetown Hoyas men's lacrosse coaches
Ohio Machine players
Chesapeake Bayhawks players
Lacrosse players from Maryland
High school lacrosse coaches in the United States
Lacrosse goaltenders